"The Wire" is the second official single released by New Zealand recording artists David Dallas and Ruby Frost from Dallas' third studio album, Falling Into Place.

Background and release
Frost sent Dallas a demo of her singing "The Wire" backed by a programmed piano. The track was refined by producers Fire & Ice "into something that would fit with the album."
It was released as the second single from the album. A P-Money remix was released by Dawn Raid Entertainment, Dirty Records and Duck Down Music on 7 February 2014.

Reception
"The Wire" entered the New Zealand Singles Chart at number twenty-six on 23 December 2013. It reached its peak position of number eleven on 20 January 2014. On 10 February 2014, it was certified Gold by Recorded Music NZ.

Charts and certifications

Charts

Certifications

References

2013 songs
2013 singles
David Dallas songs